The Wayne County Airport Authority is a governmental entity that operates airports in Metro Detroit in the U.S. state of Michigan. The authority operates Detroit Metropolitan Airport and Willow Run Airport. It has its headquarters in the 11050 Rogell Drive-Bldg 602, Detroit, MI 48242 at Detroit Metropolitan Airport in Romulus.

The authority is overseen by an independent board appointed jointly by the Governor of Michigan, the Wayne County Executive and the Wayne County Commission. Prior to the authority's founding, these two airports were operated directly by Wayne County. Michigan Senate Bill 690, signed into law on March 26, 2002, became effective on April 24 of that year, establishing the airport authority. Accordingly, as of 2002, the airports are no longer operated by Wayne County.

Although the airport authority was created as a unit of government, it receives no local tax support and is entirely self-sustaining.

See also 

 Detroit Region Aerotropolis

References

External links
Wayne County Airport Authority

County government agencies in Michigan
Transportation in Detroit
Airports in Wayne County, Michigan
Airport operators of the United States